The Munkedal railway station is a Swedish railway station. It is located along the Bohus Line. The building was designed by SJ's chief architect Folke Zettervall and was  inaugurated in connection with the opening of the Bohus Line in 1903.

References

Railway stations in Västra Götaland County